Tiki room may refer to:
 Tiki bar
 Walt Disney's Enchanted Tiki Room at Disneyland and the Magic Kingdom
 a Disney theme song: The Tiki Tiki Tiki Room
 a room filled with Tiki culture kitsch
 a room themed with Tiki elements

See also
 Tiki (disambiguation)